Pasquale "Pascal" Mazzotti (16 December 1923 in Saint-Étienne-de-Baïgorry – 19 June 2002 in Saint-Ouen-l'Aumône) was a French actor who has appeared in film, television, and theater. He is known for having played a role in Hibernatus with Louis de Funès, as well as provided the voice of Le roi (The King) in the animated feature film, Le Roi et l'oiseau (The King and the Mockingbird).
 
Mazzotti is buried in Thiais, Val-de-Marne.

Filmography

External links

1923 births
2002 deaths
French male stage actors
French male film actors
French male television actors
French male voice actors